David Edwards is the tenth Anglican Bishop of Fredericton, Canada. He was elected coadjudor bishop at a synod in Fredericton on 10 May 2014   and, subsequently, installed as diocesan bishop on September 20, 2014.  He succeeded the ninth Bishop, the Most Reverend Claude Miller, who retired on 23 June 2014. He was elected Metropolitan of the Ecclesiastical Province of Canada and assumed that position on 1 August 2020.

David Edwards was born and educated in Shropshire, England.  He studied at Loughborough University and Homerton College, Cambridge and worked as a high school history teacher prior to completing diplomas in Religious and Evangelism Studies followed by a Masters of Arts in Applied Theology at the University of Kent at Canterbury.

Both prior to and following his ordination in 1995, Archbishop Edwards served in ministry in the Diocese of Chelmsford in England, including as Bishop’s Advisor in Evangelism and in the  Parish of High Ongar.  He moved to New Brunswick in 1998 to be Principal of Taylor College of Evangelism.  He has also served in parishes in Saint John and as Parish Development Officer for the Diocese of Fredericton.

He was awarded an Honorary Doctor of Divinity from Wycliffe College (University of Toronto) in May 2015 and now serves on the College's Board of Trustees. On behalf of the Anglican Church of Canada, he also serves as Liaison Bishop to The Mission to Seafarers Canada.

References

External links
 Anglican Diocese of Fredericton website

Anglican bishops of Fredericton
21st-century Anglican Church of Canada bishops
Living people
Year of birth missing (living people)